Rudy Koopmans (also Rudi, born 30 January 1948) is a retired Dutch professional boxer who was active between 1972 and 1984. On 7 March 1979 he won the European light heavyweight title (EBU) against Aldo Traversaro in the seventh round. Over the next five years Koopmans defended this title ten times, until losing it to Richard Caramanolis in February 1984. In 1980 he fought for the WBA title but lost to Eddie Mustafa Muhammad.

After retiring from boxing, Koopmans became a bodyguard and business partner of underground businessman Bertus Lüske.

References

1948 births
Living people
Light-heavyweight boxers
Sportspeople from Leeuwarden
Dutch male boxers